The 1950 North Carolina Tar Heels football team represented the University of North Carolina at Chapel Hill during the 1950 college football season. The Tar Heels were led by eighth-year head coach Carl Snavely, and played their home games at Kenan Memorial Stadium. The team competed as a member of the Southern Conference.

Center and linebacker Irv Holdash was named a first-team All-American by the All-America Board and Associated Press.

Schedule

References

North Carolina
North Carolina Tar Heels football seasons
North Carolina Tar Heels football